Paul Young is the seventh solo studio album by English singer Paul Young and his last made up of original material. It displayed a stronger country influence than previous albums. Released in May 1997, on East West Records, the album and lead single "I Wish You Love" charted inside the UK top 40 chart.

The album also saw significantly more songwriting input from Young than on his previous albums with eight of the twelve tracks being cowritten by him.

Critical reception
A Guardian 1997 review believed the album marked a significant departure from Young's previous albums.  The album instrumentation was found to sound more akin to a Garth Brooks album than the output Young was best known for.  Despite saying the album potentially had "all the ingredients for a first-class disaster" the review rated the album as "good" and awarded it a score of 3 out of 5.

Track listing

Personnel 
 Paul Young – lead vocals, backing vocals, acoustic guitar, sitar, tambourine
 Simon Clark – keyboards (1, 3-12)
 Steve Piggott – keyboards (1, 3-12), synthesizers (3, 5, 6, 9, 12)
 Matt Irvine – accordion (1, 3, 7, 9, 11)
 Ross Cullum – keyboards (2)
 Jack Hues – programming (2), guitars (2), bass (2)
 Robbie McIntosh – electric guitar, acoustic guitar
 Jamie Moses – electric guitar, acoustic guitar, backing vocals 
 Melvin Duffy – pedal steel guitar (4, 8)
 David Pilch – bass (1, 3-9, 12)
 Chris Hughes – bass and drum programming (2)
 Steve Greetham – bass (10, 11), backing vocals 
 Pino Palladino – bass (11)
 Curt Bisquera – drums, percussion
 Greg Penny – beat box (3), tambourine (6)
 Ben Georgiades – cymbals (5)
 Bob Loveday – violin (2)
 Skaila Kanga – Paraguayan harp (3, 7, 12)
 Brendan Power – harmonica (4)
 Frank Mead – saxophone (6)
 Nick Payn – saxophone (6)
 Nick Pentelow – saxophone (6)
 Courtney Pine – saxophone (12)
 Martin Drover – trumpet (6, 7)
 Drew Barfield – backing vocals 
 Steve Booker – backing vocals 
 Boo Hewardine – backing vocals 
 Carol Kenyon – backing vocals

Production 
 Greg Penny – producer 
 Paul Young – producer 
 Chris Hughes – executive producer, mixing (2)
 Andy Strange – recording, mixing (7, 9, 12)
 Bob Clearmountain – mixing (1, 3-6, 8, 10, 11
 Ross Cullum – mixing (2)
 Tony Cousins – mastering 
 Martin Granville-Twig – mastering
 Norman Watson – photography

Charts

References

External links

Paul Young albums
1997 albums